J15 may refer to:

Vehicles

Aircraft 
 Junkers J 15, a German experimental aircraft
 Shenyang J-15, a Chinese carrier-based jet fighter

Locomotives 
 GSR Class J15, an Irish steam locomotive
 LNER Class J15, an English steam locomotive class

Ships 
 , a Sandhayak-class survey ship of the Indian Navy

Other uses 
 Bacterial pneumonia
 County Route J15 (California), a County route in Tulare County, California
 Elongated square bipyramid, a Johnson solid (J15)
 J15, a Nissan J engine model